Attorney General Delaney may refer to:

John Delaney (lawyer) (born 1964), Attorney General of the Bahamas
Michael Delaney (lawyer) (born 1969), Attorney General of New Hampshire